K-1 Grand Prix '98 Final Round was a martial arts event promoted by the K-1. The event was held at the Tokyo Dome in Tokyo, Japan on Sunday, December 13, 1998 in front of 63,800 spectators. It was the sixth K-1 World Grand Prix final involving eight of the world's best heavyweight fighters (+95 kg/209 lbs), with all bouts fought under K-1 Rules. The eight finalists had all qualified via elimination fights at the K-1 World Grand Prix '98 Opening Round.  Also on the card was a number of 'Freshman Fights' fought under a mixture of Jiu-Jitsu Freestyle and K-1 Rules (various weight classes).  In total there were eighteen fighters at the event, representing seven countries.

The tournament winner was Peter Aerts who won his third K-1 Grand Prix final by defeated Andy Hug by way of first round knockout.  Andy would be making his third consecutive final appearance, having won it in 1996 and been runner up the following year.

K-1 Grand Prix '98 Final Round Tournament

Results

See also
List of K-1 events
List of male kickboxers

References

K-1 events
1998 in kickboxing
Kickboxing in Japan
Sports competitions in Tokyo